Kim Jae-woong (born 1 January 1988) is a South Korean football midfielder.

Club career
Kim, having spent his youth career with Kyung Hee University, was selected by Incheon United from the 2011 K-League draft intake.  His first game for Incheon was as a starter in the first round match of the 2011 K-League Cup against Daejeon Citizen. His made his K League debut on 20 March 2011. In just his third match in the K League, he scored his first league goal against Seongnam Ilhwa Chunma, before scoring two more to become joint top scorer for Incheon by the tenth week of the league.

Kim went on loan to the K League Challenge side FC Anyang in 2014.

References

External links

 

1988 births
Living people
People from Wonju
Association football midfielders
South Korean footballers
Incheon United FC players
FC Anyang players
Suwon FC players
Seoul E-Land FC players
Asan Mugunghwa FC players
Korea National League players
K League 1 players
K League 2 players
Sportspeople from Gangwon Province, South Korea